Ingmar Koch (also known by his pseudonym Dr. Walker) is a German musician, producer and label owner in the field of Electronic Music. He was a member of more than 50 different techno music projects, such as Air Liquide (with Cem Oral), Khan & Walker (with Can Oral), Global Electronic Network (with Can Oral), Pierrot Premier (with Thomas Thorn), Lovecore (with Wolfgang Voigt) and Rei$$dorf Force (with Jörg Burger, Freddy Fresh, M.Flux, Thee Joker, L Nino among others).

Biography 
Koch started to produce electronic music age 14. First record release with 16. In 1991, he founded a recording studio in Frankfurt with Cem Oral, with whom he shortly afterwards formed the project Air Liquide with. In 1992, their first EP, titled Neue Frankfurter Elektronik Schule, was issued on the Cologne based record label "Blue". In 1991 Koch, Oral, Joerg Burger and Wolfgang Voigt founded the acid techno label "Structure". In 1993, Koch formed the labels XXC3 and Dj.ungle Fever (which is still active until today).

In 1993, Jörg Burger, Wolfgang Voigt and Koch together founded the Delirium Köln, a record shop, which also serves as a music label and distributor. Later Delirium Köln was renamed into "Kompakt".

The same year and following years, he recorded numerous solo releases and collaborations with artists such as Wolfgang Voigt, Biochip C., Frank Heiss, Thomas Thorn, Jörg Burger, Electric Indigo, Holger Czukay, ADSX, Wulfmanson, Mary Susan Applegate, Craig Anderton, Omsk information, Fabian Stall, FM Einheit, Andreas Thein and Triple R. With Can Oral he published, among other monikers, as Khan & Walker and Gizz TV & Walker.

In 1996, Koch and Thomas Thorn founded the electronic music bar "Liquid Sky Cologne". In 2001 he founded the artist hotel Monte Christo Köln and the underground techno club Club Camouflage Cologne in cooperation with Heike Windberger. In 2012, Koch founded the artist collective and video art gallery Liquid Sky Berlin.

2014, he started the art & music television projects Psychedelic Kitchen and lsb TV in cooperation with the Cologne video artist Uli Sigg and Berlinbased TV and Radiostation Alex Berlin.

In 2015, he began collaborating with the Leipziger Firma Hearthis.at online radio Telepathic Bubblebath, named after the record label, and with the Berliner Baeren Siegel GmbH die Internetart- / Streetart- / Performanceart- Kampagne #scrt_brln.

Also in 2015, he got involved in several cooperations with the art gallery Neu West Berlin and Riga based Synthesizer manufacturer Erica Synths.
In 2016 Koch founds the noise.berlin movement, a multimedia art & philosophy project featuring disturbing radical visuals, noise music & abstract thinking.

In 2017, Koch opened the chili-farm "SPX27" and in cooperation with the Berlin club and art-location "Maze.Berlin" the experimental musicbar and video art gallery "Liquid Sky Berlin - #lsb02".

In 2019, Koch moved the headquarters of the Liquid Sky artistcollective to Southportugal where he also started the "Liquid Sky Project 27027" reforestation project.

In 2021 start of the Liquid Sky Portugal Film Production company. 

In 2022 opening of the Liquid Sky Dolby Atmos surround sound studio and film editing suite in South Portugal.

Selected discography

Studio albums 
 1994: Global Electronic Network (=Khan & Walker) – Rolleiflex / Weltron (Mille Plateaux)
 1994: Global Electronic Network (=Khan & Walker) – Rolleiflex / Timesquare (Mille Plateaux)
 1995: Khan & Walker – Radiowaves (Harvest)
 1994: Global Electronic Network (=Khan & Walker) feat. 4E– Electronic Desert (Mille Plateaux)
 1996: Khan & Walker – Schleichfahrt (Disko B)
 1997: Holger Czukay vs. Dr. Walker – Clash (Sideburn Recordings)
 1997: Khan & Walker – Empire State Building (Harvest)
 1997: Khan & Walker – Radiowaves II (Harvest)
 1998: Dr. Walker & M. Flux – 16 Lovesongs for the Spice Girls (Harvest)
 2000: Dr. Walker – Escape From Cologne (Tone Casualties)
 2014: Adsx. Sense. Dr. Walker – MK-Naomi Sessions (XXC3 / Liquid Sky Berlin)
 2014: Khan & Walker – Empire State Building (I Am Single)
 2020: Omsk Information & Dr Walker – Escape From Treptow (lsb27 / liquid sky artistcollective)
 2020: Omsk Information & Dr Walker – The Liquid Sky Berlin Sessions (Djungle Fever)
 2021: Daniel Katzenstab & Dr Walker – Johnny Cash Backwards (lsb27 / Liquid Sky artistcollective)

Singles and EPs 
 1993: Khan & Walker – Biogas (Propulsion 285)
 1993: Walker – DJ.Ungle Fever (Dj.ungle Fever)
 1993: Mike Ink & Walker – Lovecore E.P. (Structure)
 1993: Walker / Biochip C. – Shark Volume Two (Dj.ungle Fever)
 1993: Walker – Illegal EP (Luv Traxx)
 1993: Biochip C. / Walker – Red Light District Vol. II (Dj.ungle Fever)
 1993: Walker – Drummatix Drop Outs (Communism Records)
 1993: Walker – The Sunshine E.P. (Dj.ungle Fever)
 1994: Black One – Electronic Percussion E.P. (Force Inc. Music Works)
 1994: Gizz TV & Walker – Spread / Invasion of the Bassface (Dj.ungle Fever)
 1994: Gizz TV & Walker – Live at the Electro (Dj.ungle Fever)
 1994: Walker – Business Card E.P. (Dj.ungle Fever)
 1994: Walker – U-Haft EP (Dj.ungle Fever)
 1994: Walker – Astroland EP (Direct Drive)
 1994: Mike Ink & Walker – Lovecore II (Not on Label)
 1994: Jammin' Unit vs. Walker – Money Talk$! (Dj.ungle Fever)
 1994: Walker – Redlight District Vol. 3 (Dj.ungle Fever)
 1994: Walker – Don't Fuck With Cologne (Dj.ungle Fever)
 1994: Electric Indigo & Walker – Vol. 11 (Dj.ungle Fever)
 1994: Walker – Schrei Nach Liebe (Force Inc. Music Works)
 1994: Biochip C., Jammin' Unit & Walker – Shark-Trax (Rising High Records)
 1995: Black One / Bizz O.D. – Little Funky Jazz Piano / Wo? (Dj.ungle Fever)
 1995: Black One – The New EP (Temple Records N.Y.C. Inc.)
 1995: Black One – Digital Percussion (Temple Records N.Y.C. Inc.)
 1995: Freddie Fresh vs. Dr. Walker – DJ Fresh Analog U.S. Vs. Walker Cologne DJ.Ungle Fever Germany (Analog Records USA)
 1995: Gizz TV & Walker – Little Lonesome Astronaut (Force Inc. Music Works)
 1995: Khan & Walker – Empire State Building (XXC3)
 1995: Walker & Triple R – Aufraeumen! (XXC3)
 1996: Gizz TV & Walker – Super 8 – 001 (Super 8)
 1996: Walker & Frank Heiss – Flash Dancers on Acid (Sm:)e Communications) 
 1997: Dr. Walker – Damenwahl! (Eat Raw)
 1997: Dr. Walker – Nuthin But An "E" Thang (Syncom Productionz)
 1997: Dr. Walker – Dr Walker's Psychedelic Kitchen Vol.1 (Serotonin)
 1997: Gizz TV & Walker – Spalt (Acid Orange)
 1998: Dr. Walker & M. Flux – Present Some Cockrockin Beatz (Harvest)
 1999: Khan & Walker – Simplex (Harvest)
 2000: Dr. Walker – Escape From Cologne (Tone Casualties)
 2004: Dr. Walker and Wulfmanson and Lorentz Hecker – Soundtrack From "The Car" (Dj.ungle Fever)
 2004: Dr. Walker and Wulfmanson – Fischteich EP (Dj.ungle Fever)
 2005: Rob Acid / Toktok / Wulfmanson / Dr. Walker / Sanomat – Djungle Fever Looopz (DJ.Ungle Fever)
 2005: Dr. Walker – Asbest Volume 1 (Dj.ungle Fever)
 2013: Dr. Walker – Spontane Selbstentflamunkk (Dj.ungle Fever)
 2013: Adsx. Paul Heimweh. Dr. Walker – Telepathic Bubblevinyl (XXC3 / Liquid Sky Berlin)
 2013: Dr. Walker – Hoch Die Tassen – Ab Dafuer – Remixes (Dj.ungle Fever)
 2016: Omsk Information & Dr. Walker – Psychedelic Kitchen Berlin 2016 (Subsonic Records)
 2016: Omsk Information & Dr. Walker – Only Here (Subsonic Records)
 2016: Omsk Information & Dr. Walker – Only Here (Ninja Jamm)
 2016: Monsieur Fleury & Dr. Walker – Tapearchive (Telepathic Bubblebath)
 2016: Monsieur Fleury, Daniel Katzenstab, Coldcut & Dr. Walker – Industrial Sky (Ninja Jamm)
 2019: Dr Walker – Businesscard Ep (Holding Hand Records)
 2020: Omsk Information & Dr. Walker – Drubble Ep (Dj.ungle Fever)
 2020: Khan & Walker – Schleichfahrt rmxd & rmstrd (Dj.ungle Fever)
 2021: Dr Walker – Redlight District vol IV Remastered (Dj.ungle Fever)
 2021: Dr Walker – Live At MICA 2021 (lsb27 / Liquid Sky artistcollective)

Please check Discogs for a more complete discography.

References

External links 
 Dr. Walkers Liquid Sky artistcollective and Film Production Company
 Dr. Walkers IMDb Profile
 Dr. Walkers & Liquid Skys Soundcloud Profile
 Dr. Walker Interview on Amazona.de
 Dr. Walkers facebookpage
 interview about the Liquid Sky Berlin – lsb02 club
 Liquid Sky Project 27027 reforestation project in southportugal
 article about the reforestation project on CDM magazine
 feature about Dr Walkers main bandproject "Air Liquide"
 Air Liquide Bandcamp
 Liquid Sky artistcollective Bandcamp
 Air Liquide "Almost Complete" Playlist on Spotify
 

Living people
German keyboardists
Air Liquide (band) members
Acid house musicians
Ambient musicians
German electronic musicians
German experimental musicians
German techno musicians
German trance musicians
German record producers
Year of birth missing (living people)